Peter Camm (born 19 July 1980) is an English cricketer.  Camm is a right-handed batsman who bowls right-arm medium pace.  He was born at Chesterfield, Derbyshire.

Camm represented the Derbyshire Cricket Board in 3 List A cricket matches.  These came against Wales Minor Counties in the 1999 NatWest Trophy, Wiltshire in the 2001 Cheltenham & Gloucester Trophy and Bedfordshire in the 1st round of the 2002 Cheltenham & Gloucester Trophy which was held in 2002.  In his 3 List A matches, he scored 20 runs at a batting average of 10.00, with a high score of 20.  With the ball he took 4 wickets at a bowling average of 36.25, with best figures of 4/52.

Camm currently plays club cricket for Matlock Cricket Club in the Derbyshire Premier Cricket League.

References

External links
Peter Camm at Cricinfo
Peter Camm at CricketArchive

1980 births
Living people
Cricketers from Chesterfield, Derbyshire
English cricketers
Derbyshire Cricket Board cricketers